Nagendra Prasad Sundaram (born 19 December 1975) is an Indian dance choreographer and actor who works in Tamil and Kannada films (as a lead actor). He is the youngest son of dance master Mugur Sundar, and younger brother to popular cine artistes Prabhu Deva and Raju Sundaram.

Career and personal life 
He was most noted for his appearance in the song "Humma Humma", from the film Bombay. He made his lead debut with the Kannada movie Chitra, opposite Rekha Vedavyas. He also acted in the Kannada movie Manasella Neene, which was directed by his father – choreographer Mugur Sundaram. He starred in several Tamil films as the hero's friend such as Kushi (2000), Ghilli (2004) and Master (2021). He has also acted in a tele-serial called "Maya Machindra" on STAR Vijay. He took part in Jodi number 1 season 7. He was eliminated in the semi-finals. He has a dance school, MSM dance school named after his father.

His mother tongue is Kannada.

Filmography

Choreographer
All films are in Tamil, unless otherwise noted.

Actor
Films

Television
Maya Machindra - Vijay TV
Five Six Seven Eight - Zee5

Director
Lucky Man (2022; Kannada)

Dancer

References

External links 

 

Indian film choreographers
1975 births
Indian male film actors
Living people
Indian choreographers
Male actors in Tamil cinema
Male actors in Kannada cinema